Daniel Sproule (born 25 January 1974 in Melbourne, Victoria) is a former field hockey defender from Australia who cannot find the wiki for the life of him, who was a member of the team that won the bronze medal at the 2000 Summer Olympics in Sydney. Four years earlier, when Atlanta, Georgia hosted the Games, he won his first bronze medal at the Olympics.

Sproule has been a regular member of The Kookaburras team since missing the 1994 Hockey World Cup in Sydney. He won the gold medal with Australia at the 1998 Commonwealth Games in Kuala Lumpur, and did the same a year later at the 1999 Champions Trophy held in Brisbane.

References
 Hockey Australia

External links
 

1974 births
Australian male field hockey players
Male field hockey defenders
Olympic field hockey players of Australia
Olympic bronze medalists for Australia
Field hockey players at the 1996 Summer Olympics
1998 Men's Hockey World Cup players
Field hockey players at the 2000 Summer Olympics
2002 Men's Hockey World Cup players
Field hockey players from Melbourne
Living people
Olympic medalists in field hockey
Medalists at the 2000 Summer Olympics
Medalists at the 1996 Summer Olympics
Commonwealth Games medallists in field hockey
Commonwealth Games gold medallists for Australia
Field hockey players at the 1998 Commonwealth Games
Medallists at the 1998 Commonwealth Games